The Mulhouse Alsace Agglomération is the Communauté d'agglomération, a type of local government structure, covering the metropolitan area of the city of Mulhouse in the department of Haut-Rhin and the region of Grand Est, northeastern France. Its area is 439.2 km2. Its population was 274,066 in 2018, of which 108,942 in Mulhouse proper. The current president of the agglomeration community is Fabian Jordan, elected January 2017.

Composition
The Mulhouse Alsace Agglomération covers 39 communes:

Baldersheim
Bantzenheim
Battenheim
Berrwiller
Bollwiller
Bruebach
Brunstatt-Didenheim
Chalampé
Dietwiller
Eschentzwiller
Feldkirch
Flaxlanden
Galfingue
Habsheim
Heimsbrunn
Hombourg
Illzach
Kingersheim
Lutterbach
Morschwiller-le-Bas
Mulhouse
Niffer
Ottmarsheim
Petit-Landau
Pfastatt
Pulversheim
Reiningue
Richwiller
Riedisheim
Rixheim
Ruelisheim
Sausheim
Staffelfelden
Steinbrunn-le-Bas
Ungersheim
Wittelsheim
Wittenheim
Zillisheim
Zimmersheim

Responsibilities
On behalf of its 39 communes, the agglomeration exercises responsibility for:

 Spatial planning
 District heating
 Social cohesion
 Culture and tourism
 Sustainable Development
 Economic Development
 Higher education
 Employment
 Sports facilities
 Housing
 Senior citizen's services
 Children's services
 Public safety and citizenship
 Street cleaning, garbage collection and waste disposal
 Transportation and travel

Some of these responsibilities are subcontracted to the private sector. For example, the provision of the agglomeration's bus and tram network is subcontracted to Soléa.

References

External links
Official website of the Mulhouse Alsace Agglomération 

Agglomeration communities in France
Mulhouse
Intercommunalities of Haut-Rhin